{{DISPLAYTITLE:C3H9NO}}
The molecular formula C3H9NO (molar mass: 75.11 g/mol, exact mass: 75.0684 u) may refer to:

 Propanolamine
 Alaninol
 1-Amino-2-propanol
 3-Amino-1-propanol
 N-Methylethanolamine
 Trimethylamine N-oxide